Various American  fugitives in Cuba have found political asylum in Cuba after participating in militant activities in the Black power movement or the Independence movement in Puerto Rico. Other fugitives in Cuba include defected CIA agents and others. The Cuban government formed formal ties with the Black Panther Party in the 1960s, and many fugitive Black Panthers would find political asylum in Cuba, but after their activism was seen being repressed in Cuba many became disillusioned. House Concurrent Resolution 254, passed in 1998, put the number at 90. One estimate, c. 2000, put the number at approximately 100.

History

Beginnings
Fidel Castro had long tried to court African American support for Cuba ever since the victory of the Cuban Revolution and the promotions of Cuba as an island without racism perfect for African American tourists. Robert F. Williams was invited to live in Cuba after legal prosecutions against him in the United States in 1961. While in Cuba he edited The Crusader newspaper and hosted radio shows at Radio Free Dixie. Over Williams' time in Cuba he began to become disillusioned with Cuba believing the island was controlled by a "white petit bourgeoisie", while Afro-Cubans were feeling the pinch of fast returning subtle racism", and also later suggested against black militants without criminal histories hijacking planes to come to Cuba. Williams was also discouraged from promoting Black nationalist beliefs by the Cuban government.

Increase
Between 1967 and 1968 dozens of Black Panthers found refuge in Cuba. Eldridge Cleaver went to reside Cuba in 1968 and asked for Cuba to militarily train Black Panthers, the proposition was declined. By 1969 various Black Panthers in Cuba complained of not being allowed to organize their party or discuss African culture, and arrests following protesting conditions in Cuba or asking to leave the country.

Between 1968 and 1972 over 130 airplane hijackings occurred in the United States, all hijackers aiming to fly their planes to Cuba to find refuge. Many hijackers regarded themselves as revolutionaries but one noted hijacker was a Cuban exile who simply wanted to return home to eat his mother's food. Most hijackers were interviewed by Cuban authorities and either sent to live in the "Hijackers House" dormitory or work in labor camps. Huey P. Newton found himself residing in Cuba in 1974 and mostly kept to himself in his home in Santa Clara. Assata Shakur would find refuge in Cuba later in 1984. By the time Shakur resided in Cuba the Cuban government had relaxed procedures used on fugitives residing in Cuba and mainly left her to her own devices.

Later status
Since the resumption of relations with the United States and the trades of imprisoned spies some have suspected fugitives in Cuba may be extradited to the United States but no extraditions have occurred.

List
The following people are fugitives who have or currently are finding refuge in Cuba, (in alphabetical order).

Nehanda Abiodun
Philip Agee
Hugh Almeida, U.S. Army physician
William Lee Brent
Eldridge Cleaver
Lorenzo Kom'boa Ervin
Víctor Manuel Gerena
William Morales
Huey P. Newton
Assata Shakur
Frank Terpil
Robert Vesco
Robert F. Williams

See also

Cuba-United States relations
List of people granted political asylum

References

Cuba–United States relations
 
American expatriates in Cuba
Black Panther Party
Black Power
Fugitives wanted by the United States
Post–civil rights era in African-American history
African-American diaspora in the Caribbean